Julien Thode (born 11 September 1964) is a sprinter who represented the Netherlands Antilles. He competed in the men's 100 metres at the 1984 Summer Olympics.

References

1964 births
Living people
Athletes (track and field) at the 1984 Summer Olympics
Dutch Antillean male sprinters
Olympic athletes of the Netherlands Antilles
World Athletics Championships athletes for the Netherlands Antilles
Place of birth missing (living people)